Victoria Square is a shopping complex located in Belfast, Northern Ireland. The area includes over 70 shops, several restaurants and an Odeon cinema. Opened on 6 March 2008, Victoria Square is a commercial, residential and leisure development that took 6 years to build.

Design 
Victoria Square was developed by Multi Development UK Ltd. The architects were Building Design Partnership and T+T Design, the in house architects of Multi Corporation.

An element of the development is two covered, multi-level streets linked to the glass dome which measures 37 m in diameter and 45 m in height. A public square covered entirely by the glass dome serves as the hub of the entire area. The Jaffe Fountain, constructed in the 1870s by former Lord Mayor Otto Jaffe in memory of his father, has been restored to its original location in Victoria Square. There are pedestrian links to nearby business, nightlife and shopping streets on Laganside, Donegall Place, Royal Avenue and Ann Street.

A large section of the center's roof is covered in Sedum in an attempt to reduce the carbon footprint of Victoria Square.

Facilities 
The development spans approximately 800,000 ft² (75,000m²) of retail over four floors. Q-Park provides 2 levels of basement parking with c. 1,000 car spaces.

The retail space includes 98 unit shops, with leisure units including an 8 screen Odeon Cinema. There are also restaurants, bars and cafés.

The development also included 106 apartments.

On 24 November 2013, a car bomb detonated outside a Victoria Square car park. There were no injuries.

Belfast Great Victoria Street railway station is nearby.

Gallery

References 

Shopping centres in Northern Ireland
Buildings and structures in Belfast
Domes
Tourist attractions in Belfast
Shopping malls established in 2008
2008 establishments in Northern Ireland
21st-century architecture in Northern Ireland